A hound is a type of dog that assists hunters by tracking or chasing the animal being hunted.

Hound may also refer to:
 Dog, any dog of the subfamily Caninae

Arts and entertainment
 Hounds (TV series), a 2012 television comedy series set around greyhound racing in Auckland, New Zealand
 "The Hound", a short story by H. P. Lovecraft
 The Hound (singer) (born 1986), American singer, songwriter, and record producer

Fictional characters
 Hounds (comics), the name given to several groups of mutant characters from Marvel Comics
 Sandor Clegane, nicknamed The Hound, a fictional character in the A Song of Ice and Fire series of fantasy novels and its television adaptation Game of Thrones

Ships
 Danish ship Trost, also known as Hunden ("Hound")
 HMS Hound, a name given to fifteen ships of the Royal Navy

Other uses
 Hound (heraldry), used as a charge in classical heraldry
 Hound, a virtual assistant app developed by SoundHound
 De Havilland Hound, a 1920s British two-seat day bomber built by De Havilland Aircraft Company at Stag Lane Aerodrome
 Hound, Hampshire, a village in the Borough of Eastleigh, UK

See also